The Collège communautaire du Nouveau-Brunswick-Campus Campbellton Campus is an institution of higher education (CCNB) in Campbellton, New Brunswick.

The college is located on Avenue Village and was founded in 1970.

External links
Campbellton Campus

Education in Campbellton, New Brunswick
Collège communautaire du Nouveau-Brunswick